Aleksandr Petrovich Shirko (born 24 November 1976) is a Russian football scout and a former player. He works as a scout of FC Khimki.

Playing career
Shirko started his professional career with Spartak Moscow, with whom he won six Russian Premier League titles, from 1996 to 2001, and become one of the top scorers of the UEFA Cup in the 1997/1998 season, before leaving for city-rivals Torpedo.
In 2004 Shirko joined Shinnik Yaroslavl as part of a loan deal from Torpedo, but then extended his stay at the club by two years.
In 2006 Aleksandr Shirko was involved in a fight with Shinnik fans, after a disappointing 1–6 defeat to Rostov. That accident earned him a ten-match ban.
At the start of 2007, Shirko signed with Tom Tomsk, in club's attempt to replace Pavel Pogrebnyak, who left for Zenit Saint Petersburg.
During his professional career, Shirko earned six caps for Russia national football team from 1999 to 2001, scoring one goal in a 3–0 win over Faroe Islands in 2001.

International goals

External links 
 Player profile 
 

1976 births
Footballers from Moscow
Living people
Russian footballers
Russia youth international footballers
Russia under-21 international footballers
Russia international footballers
FC Spartak Moscow players
Russian Premier League players
FC Torpedo Moscow players
FC Shinnik Yaroslavl players
FC Tom Tomsk players
FC Akhmat Grozny players
Association football forwards
FC MVD Rossii Moscow players